Dursun Ali Eğribaş (1933 – August 2014) was a Turkish wrestler. He won a bronze medal in flyweight at the 1956 Summer Olympics in Melbourne.

References

External links
 

1933 births
2014 deaths
Olympic wrestlers of Turkey
Wrestlers at the 1956 Summer Olympics
Turkish male sport wrestlers
Olympic bronze medalists for Turkey
Olympic medalists in wrestling
Medalists at the 1956 Summer Olympics
20th-century Turkish people
21st-century Turkish people